James Sample is the name of:

James Sample (American football) (born 1992), American football safety
James Sample (conductor) (1910–1995), American conductor
Jim Sample (1921–1992), English footballer
James Sample (preacher), American preacher

See also
James Samples (born 1963), American businessman